Underwater refers to the realm below the surface of a body of water.

Underwater may also refer to:

Film
 Underwater!, a 1955 film starring Jane Russell
 Underwater (film), a 2020 film starring Kristen Stewart

Music
 Underwater (album), by Joshua Radin, 2012
 "Underwater" (Delerium song), 2002
 "Underwater" (Mika song), 2012
 "Underwater" (Rüfüs Du Sol song), 2018
 "Underwater", a song by Circa Zero from Circus Hero
 "Underwater", a song by Meghan Trainor from Treat Myself
 "Underwater", a song by the National from I Am Easy to Find
 "Underwater", a song by Switchfoot from The Legend of Chin

Other uses
 Underwater (comics), a 1990s alternative comic by Chester Brown
 Negative equity or "underwater", when an asset is worth less than the balance of the loan used to secure it

See also
 
 Unterwasser (German for "underwater"), a village in Switzerland